Peyman (also transliterated as Paymon, Peiman, Paymaan or Payman) is a Persian and Kurdish  name which is used as a given name and a surname. Notable people with the name include:

Given name

Peyman
 Peyman Faratin (born 1965), Iranian computer scientist
 Peyman Fattahi (born 1973), Iranian reformist
 Peyman Hooshmandzadeh (born 1969), Iranian photographer
 Peyman Ghasem Khani (born 1967), Iranian screenwriter
 Peyman Soltani (born 1971), Iranian musician
 Peyman Yazdanian (born 1968), Iranian film score composer

Payman
 Payman Maadi (born 1970), Iranian actor

Surname

Peyman
 Gholam A. Peyman (born 1937), American ophthalmologist
 Habibollah Peyman (born 1935), Iranian politician
 David Peyman, American government official

Payman
 Fatima Payman (born c. 1995), Afghan-born Australian politician

See also
 Payman, monthly political magazine by Ahmad Kasravi

Persian masculine given names